Lucy is a feminine given name.

Lucy may also refer to:

Science 
 Lucy (Australopithecus), a 3.2-million-year-old fossilized hominid
 Lucy (chimpanzee) (1964-1987), known for having been taught American sign language
 Lucy, a robot baby orangutan which was the subject of an artificial life experiment by Steve Grand
 Nickname of BPM 37093, a white dwarf star
Lucy (spacecraft), a NASA space probe launched in 2021 to explore the Trojan asteroids

Music

Albums
 Lucy (Candlebox album), 1995
 Lucy (Maaya Sakamoto album), 2001
 Lucy (Lucy Wainwright Roche album)

Bands
 Lucy (English band), a pre-Def Leppard band of guitarist Phil Collen
 Lucy (South Korean band)
 Lucy, a Japanese rock band formed by Imai Hisashi in 2004

Instruments
 Lucy (guitar), owned at various times by John Sebastian, Rick Derringer, Eric Clapton and George Harrison
 Lucy (Albert King guitar), any of three guitars played by the blues guitarist

Songs
 "Lucy" (Alliage song)
 "Lucy" (Anna Tsuchiya song)
 "Lucy" (The Divine Comedy song)
 "Lucy" (Julian Lennon and James Scott Cook song)
 "Lucy" (Skillet song)
 "Lucy" (Tom Dice song)
 "Lucy", by Adam Lambert on the album The Original High
 "Lucy", by Candlebox on the album Lucy
 "Lucy", by Hanne Hukkelberg on the soundtrack The Chronicles of Narnia: Prince Caspian
 "Lucy", by the American band Hanson
 "Lucy", by Nick Cave on the album The Good Son
 "Lucy", by Pepper on the album Pink Crustaceans and Good Vibrations
 "Lucy", by Y&T on the album Ten
 "Lucy", on The Buzz on Maggie
 "Lucy", a song by Sharon Needles from Taxidermy

In fiction 
 Lucy (novel) (1990), by Jamaica Kincaid – a West Indian au pair in America 
 Lucy (2003 film), a TV biopic about Lucille Ball
 Lucy (2006 film), a German drama film about a young mother
 Lucy (2014 film), by Luc Besson starring Scarlett Johansson – a woman acquires psychokinetic powers etc. 
 The Lucy poems, composed by the English Romantic poet William Wordsworth
 Lucy, the Daughter of the Devil, an animated television show
 Lucy van Pelt, a character in the comic strip Peanuts
 "Lucy", an episode of the television series The Returned

Places

France
 Lucy, Moselle, in the Moselle department
 Lucy, Seine-Maritime, in the Seine-Maritime department
 Lucy-le-Bocage, in the Aisne department
 Lucy-le-Bois, in the Yonne department
 Lucy-sur-Cure, in the Yonne department
 Lucy-sur-Yonne, in the Yonne department

United States
 Lake Lucy, a lake in Minnesota
 Lucy, Alabama

Animals
 Lucy (elephant), at the Edmonton Valley Zoo
 Lucy (dog), on the children's television show Blue Peter
 In heraldry, the Esox, of which the northern pike is a member

Ships
, a Costa Rican coaster in service 1953-60
Lucy (barge), a sailing barge built in 1922

Other uses 
 Lucy (surname)
 Lucy Activewear, a women's activewear company
 The Lucy spy ring, a World War II espionage operation
 Lucy, a codeword for LSD
 Lucy, a doll in the Betty Spaghetty series
 Lucy the Elephant, an elephant-shaped building in Margate City, New Jersey
 Lucy, a member of the South Korean girl group Weki Meki

See also

 
 
 
 Lucey (disambiguation)
 Luce (disambiguation)
 Lucie (disambiguation)
 Luci (disambiguation)
 Lucille (disambiguation)
 Lusi (disambiguation)